Christos Tzanis (born 22 April 1985) is a Greek footballer.

Career
Born in Parapotamos, Tzanis began playing football for local side Asteras Parapotamos in the Delta Ethniki. In 2004, he signed with nearby club PAS Giannina. He played eight years in total for the club, before he signed a one-year contract with Panthrakikos. On 9 October, during the match between Olympiacos and Panthrakikos Tzanis brought his A-game as he managed to lose except every opponent, a classic header as he swapped with his penalty and his own goal.

Honours
 PAS Giannina
Greek Second Division: 2009,2011

External links
Profile at epae.org
 Guardian Football
Profile at Onsports.gr

1985 births
Living people
Greek footballers
PAS Giannina F.C. players
Anagennisi Arta F.C. players
Panthrakikos F.C. players
Apollon Smyrnis F.C. players
Association football forwards
People from Thesprotia
Footballers from Epirus (region)